The surname Duff has several origins. In some cases, it is an Anglicised form of the Gaelic Ó Duibh ("descendant of Dubh"), Mac Giolla Duibh ("son of the servant of Dubh"), Mac Duibh ("son of Dubh"). The surname Duff is also sometimes a short form of Duffin (when of Gaelic origin), and MacElduff (from Mac Giolla Duibh), and Duffy (a name with multiple origins).

The Gaelic dubh ("black", "dark") is a word-element which forms a part of several Gaelic names.

Le Duff is the gallicized variant of the Breton surname An Du which means The Black.

People
 Alan Duff (born 1950), New Zealand writer
 Alexander Duff (missionary) (1806–1878), founder of Scottish Church College, Calcutta
 Alexander Duff (Royal Navy officer) (1862–1933), British admiral
 Andrew Duff, British politician
 Anne Macintosh Duff (1925–2022), Canadian watercolor artist
 Anne-Marie Duff, British actress
 Antony Duff, past head of MI5
 Arthur Duff (1899–1956), Irish composer
 Bob Duff (rugby union) (1925–2006), New Zealand rugby union player and coach
 Cara Leland Duff, later Lady Fairhaven
 Chris Duff, American expedition sea kayaker
 Damien Duff, Irish football manager and former player 
 Dick Duff, Canadian ice hockey player
 Douglas Duff, policeman and author
 Duncan Duff, Scottish actor
 Edward Gordon Duff, British bibliographer and librarian
 Elmyra Duff, fictional character from Tiny Toon Adventures
 Ernest Duff (1931–2016), American businessman, lawyer and Mormon bishop
 Captain George Duff of the Royal Navy who commanded HMS Mars at the Battle of Trafalgar
 George F. D. Duff, (1926–2001) Canadian mathematician
 Gordon William Duff, British professor
 Hailey Duff (born 1997), Scottish curler
 Haylie Duff, American actress, Hilary's sister
 Hilary Duff, American pop singer and actress, Haylie's sister
 Howard Duff, American actor
 Jamal Duff, American actor and former NFL American football player
 James Duff (disambiguation)
 Jason Duff, Australian field hockey player
 Jill Duff, Anglican priest and Bishop-designate of Lancaster
 John Duff (disambiguation)
 Louis Le Duff, French billionaire businessman
 Lyman Poore Duff, Canadian Chief Justice
 Michael Duff (physicist), British physicist and string theorist
 Michael Duff (footballer), Northern Ireland footballer
 Sir Michael Duff, 3rd Baronet, British hereditary peer
 Mickey Duff, British boxing promoter
 Sir Mountstuart Elphinstone Grant Duff (1829–1906), Scottish politician and author
 Norwich Duff, British admiral
 Patrick Duff, British singer-songwriter 
 Peggy Duff, British activist
 Philip S. Duff, American newspaper editor and politician
 Reggie Duff, Australian cricketer
 Rick Duff, Canadian boxer
 Robert Duff (disambiguation)
 Roger Duff, New Zealand ethnologist
 Shane Duff, Northern Irish footballer
 Stan Duff (1919–1941), English footballer
 Thomas Duff, Irish architect
 Tom Duff, Canadian computer scientist
 Warren B. Duff, film and television writer and producer
 William E. Duff, American writer on counterespionage

In the British Royal Family:
 Princess Alexandra, 2nd Duchess of Fife (1891–1959), née Duff
 Princess Maud, Countess of Southesk (1893–1945), née Duff

Scottish aristocrats:
 William Duff, 1st Earl Fife (c. 1696 – 1763)  
 James Duff, 2nd Earl Fife (1729–1809)
 Alexander Duff, 3rd Earl Fife (1731–1811)
 James Duff, 4th Earl Fife (1776–1857)
 James Duff, 5th Earl Fife (1814–1879)
 Alexander Duff, 6th Earl Fife (1849–1912) (became Duke of Fife in 1887)
 Alexander Duff, 1st Duke of Fife (1849–1912)

See also
Clan MacDuff
Duff (disambiguation)
McDuff (disambiguation)
Le Duff, another surname

References

English-language surnames
Surnames of Irish origin
Anglicised Irish-language surnames